Balrampur Lok Sabha constituency was a Lok Sabha (parliamentary) constituency in northern India. Balrampur is in Uttar Pradesh state . This constituency ceased to exist in 2008 with the implementation of delimitation of the parliamentary constituencies. Most of the area under the erstwhile Balrampur seat now falls under Shravasti Lok Sabha constituency since 2008.

Former PM Shri Atal Bihari Bajpai contested Lucknow by-election in 1955 and came third. Then in 1957, he contested General Election in three seats. He finished fourth in Mathura, second in Lucknow, and won in Balrampur as his first time representing Lok Sabha. In 1962, he contested Balrampur and Lucknow, and lost in both the seats. In 1967, he contested Balrampur and this time won.

Members of Parliament

Election results

1957 Lok Sabha Election
 Atal Bihari Vajpayee (BJS) : 118,380 votes 
 Hyder Hussain (INC) : 108,568 votes

Uttar Pradesh

1962 Lok Sabha Election
 Subhadra Joshi (INC) : 102,260  votes 
 Atal Behari Bajpai (sic, he spelled it Atal Bihari Vajpayee himself) (JS) : 100,208

1967 Lok Sabha Election
 A. Behari (Atal Bihari Vajpayee) (Bharatiya Jana Sangh) : 142,446  votes 
 S. Joshi (INC) : 110,704

2004 Lok Sabha Election
 Brij Bhushan Sharan Singh (BJP) 270,941 votes 
 Rizwan Zaheer Alias Rijju Bhaya (BSP) : 218,328

See also
 Balrampur district, Uttar Pradesh
 List of former constituencies of the Lok Sabha

References

Balrampur district, Uttar Pradesh
Former Lok Sabha constituencies of Uttar Pradesh
Former constituencies of the Lok Sabha
2008 disestablishments in India
Constituencies disestablished in 2008